Z100 may refer to:

American radio stations known as Z100
 KKRZ in Portland, Oregon
 KZOQ-FM in Missoula, Montana
 KZRO in Mount Shasta, California
 WBIZ-FM in Eau Claire, Wisconsin
 WHTZ in Newark, New Jersey
 WJZR, now WRFX, in Kannapolis/Charlotte, North Carolina, known as Z100 from August 1983 until late 1985.
 WZRA, now WEAN-FM, in Wakefield-Peacedale, Rhode Island
 KLRZ in New Orleans, Louisiana, known as Z-100 in the 1990s
 WZZF, now WVVR in Hopkinsville, Kentucky, known as Z-100 from 1986 until 1994.

Other uses
 Zenith Z-100, an early microcomputer
 Sendo Z100, a mobile phone model
 Z100, a Shanghai–Kowloon through train

See also
 Zenair CH 100